Jonathan Soriano Casas (born 24 September 1985) is a Spanish former professional footballer who played as a striker.

He spent his early career with Espanyol and Barcelona, mostly with the respective reserve teams. In January 2012 he moved to Red Bull Salzburg, where he won four league and cup doubles, also finishing as the Austrian Football Bundesliga's top scorer three times; he totalled 172 goals in 202 matches for the latter club.

Soriano earned 25 caps for Spain at youth level, scoring 27 times. He also played for Catalonia.

Club career

Espanyol
Born in El Pont de Vilomara i Rocafort, Barcelona, Catalonia, Soriano emerged through RCD Espanyol's youth ranks. He made his debut with the first team during the 2002–03 season, playing one minute in a 3–1 La Liga home win against Rayo Vallecano while still registered with the B side. He was not admitted as a full-time member of the main squad until 2005–06.

Soriano spent the second halves of that and the following campaigns serving Segunda División loan stints, after which he returned to the Estadi Olímpic Lluís Companys, scoring twice in 24 appearances during the season, incidentally in both 1–0 victories over Getafe CF.

In late January 2009, Soriano moved again on loan (and in the second tier), joining Albacete Balompié until the end of the campaign and being released by Espanyol after this spell, his contract not having been renewed.

Barcelona
On 30 July 2009, Soriano joined FC Barcelona's reserves in Segunda División B. He made his official first-team debut on 28 October 2009, playing the dying minutes of the 2–0 win at Cultural y Deportiva Leonesa in the round of 32 of the Copa del Rey (7–0 on aggregate). In the league, he ranked amongst the season's top scorers as the team returned to the second division after an 11-year absence.

Soriano fared even better in 2010–11, netting 32 times as Barcelona B finished in the promotion play-offs zone, being however ineligible for contention. This tally gave him the division's Pichichi Trophy, and in the process he eclipsed the club's previous record for most goals by a player in a single season, which was 15 by Martín Domínguez in 1987–88. His performances caught the eyes of Real Betis, and his failure to get a contract with Barcelona was compared to the success of 2. Bundesliga top scorer Nils Petersen in signing for FC Bayern Munich.

Red Bull Salzburg
On 19 January 2012, Soriano moved to the Austrian Football Bundesliga with FC Red Bull Salzburg. In his first year he helped his team win the double, but needing time to adapt, he contributed only five goals in 15 games.

Soriano was sent off on 17 July 2012 in a 1–0 loss at F91 Dudelange, having played only 37 minutes as a substitute for Gonzalo Zárate in the first leg of the second qualifying round of the UEFA Champions League. He struck 26 goals in 32 games over the league season, including a hat-trick on 20 April 2013 in a 6–2 win against Wolfsberger AC; that morning, he witnessed his wife Cristina Sabater giving birth to their daughter.

In the summer of 2013, Soriano was appointed Red Bull's new captain. He scored a hat-trick in their UEFA Europa League play-off first leg against VMFD Žalgiris Vilnius, a 5–0 victory on 22 August. In his team's first match in the group stage, on 19 September, he added another three to help to a 4–0 home defeat of IF Elfsborg. In the round of 32, he grabbed a brace in a 2–0 win at AFC Ajax, and despite the team exiting in the next stage, he was the tournament's top scorer with eight goals, only the second Spaniard to do so after Rayo Vallecano's Bolo in 2000–01.

Soriano was the league's top scorer with 31 goals in 28 games – including four hat-tricks – as Salzburg regained the title. The Austrian Cup also returned to the team, and he netted another treble in a 9–0 first-round rout of lowly Union St. Florian. In the final on 18 May, he scored twice in a 4–2 win over SKN St. Pölten at the Wörthersee Stadion.

On 10 August 2014, Soriano scored five goals in an 8–0 home league demolition of SV Grödig. On 6 November, he netted a hat-trick as Salzburg won 5–1 at GNK Dinamo Zagreb in the Europa League group stage. He extended his contract in January of the following year until June 2018 or 2019, and at the end of the campaign was voted the league's Player of the Year. In the cup final, he scored an extra-time goal in a 2–0 win over FK Austria Wien.

On 26 September 2015, Soriano scored four goals in a 4–2 home win against SV Mattersburg. On 24 October, he netted his 100th league goal whilst helping to a 2–1 victory over SV Ried also at the Red Bull Arena. He arrived at the century mark in 113 games, quicker than national icons Hans Krankl and Toni Polster, and by the following March he had achieved 150 goals in 170 matches across all competitions; manager Óscar García stated: "He is the best footballer I have ever worked with. I hope he never leaves".

For the third successive year, Soriano was the top scorer as his team won the league, and he scored three times in a 5–0 win over FC Admira Wacker Mödling in the cup final to seal another double. In March 2017, the club retired his number 26 jersey.

Beijing Guoan
On 26 February 2017, Soriano signed for Beijing Sinobo Guoan F.C. after recommendation from former club player Frédéric Kanouté. He scored regularly over his first season in the Chinese Super League, although his team finished ninth. On 23 July, his brace gave them a 2–1 win at Shanghai Greenland Shenhua FC.

Later years
On 14 December 2018, free agent Soriano moved to Saudi Professional League club Al Hilal SFC on a one-and-a-half year contract. He returned to his home country on 31 August 2019, after agreeing to a one-year deal at second-tier Girona FC.

On 7 March 2021, after nearly eight months without a club, Soriano signed a short-term contract with CD Castellón, also in the second division. On 24 September, his 36th birthday, he officially announced his retirement from professional football.

International career
Soriano was the top scorer at the 2002 UEFA European Under-17 Championship with seven goals, as Spain came fourth in Denmark. All of his goals came in group stage victories, a hat-trick against Moldova between braces against the Czech Republic and FR Yugoslavia.

On 8 February 2005, as a half-time replacement for Alberto Zapater, Soriano scored four times for the under-21 team in a 14–0 thrashing of San Marino in El Ejido. He also took part on the Catalan representative side, scoring their goal in a draw with Paraguay at the Camp Nou on 28 December 2005.

Career statistics

Honours

Espanyol
Copa del Rey: 2005–06

Red Bull Salzburg
Austrian Football Bundesliga: 2011–12, 2013–14, 2014–15, 2015–16
Austrian Cup: 2011–12, 2013–14, 2014–15, 2015–16

Beijing Guoan
Chinese FA Cup: 2018

Individual
Pichichi Trophy/Zarra Trophy (Segunda División): 2010–11
Austrian Football Bundesliga top scorer: 2013–14, 2014–15, 2015–16 
UEFA Europa League top scorer: 2013–14
UEFA Europa League Squad of the Season: 2013–14

References

External links

FC Barcelona official profile

1985 births
Living people
People from Bages
Sportspeople from the Province of Barcelona
Spanish footballers
Footballers from Catalonia
Association football forwards
La Liga players
Segunda División players
Segunda División B players
RCD Espanyol B footballers
RCD Espanyol footballers
Polideportivo Ejido footballers
UD Almería players
Albacete Balompié players
FC Barcelona Atlètic players
FC Barcelona players
Girona FC players
CD Castellón footballers
Austrian Football Bundesliga players
FC Red Bull Salzburg players
Chinese Super League players
Beijing Guoan F.C. players
Saudi Professional League players
Al Hilal SFC players
Spain youth international footballers
Spain under-21 international footballers
Catalonia international footballers
Spanish expatriate footballers
Expatriate footballers in Austria
Expatriate footballers in China
Expatriate footballers in Saudi Arabia
Spanish expatriate sportspeople in Austria
Spanish expatriate sportspeople in China
Spanish expatriate sportspeople in Saudi Arabia